Delivery Boys is a 1984 film directed by Ken Handler about a multiethnic group of pizza delivery boys who start a breakdancing team.

Mario Van Peebles, Scott Thompson Baker, Kelly Nichols, Samantha Fox, Veronica Hart and Annabelle Gurwitch have cameo roles. Naima Kradjian, a former Republican candidate for mayor of Binghamton, New York, also appears in the film.

References

External links

Free Delivery Boys video short at Amazon

1984 films
1984 comedy films
Breakdancing films
American dance films
American comedy films
1980s American films